Gotthardt Kuehl (28 November 1850 – 9 January 1915) was a German painter and a representative of early German Impressionism. He gained wide international recognition during his lifetime.

Life and work 
He studied at the Dresden Academy of Fine Arts (1867) and the Academy of Fine Arts, Munich,  (1870). From 1878 to 1889, he lived in Paris. He also made study trips to Italy and the Netherlands. In 1888, he married Henriette Simonson-Castelli (1860–1921), daughter of the portrait painter, .

Together, they were also influential in introducing Impressionism there. In 1895, he was named a Professor at the Academy. The following year, he was awarded a gold medal at the Große Berliner Kunstausstellung. In 1902, he was one of the founding members of another artists' association, "". He also served as one of the first board members of the Deutschen Künstlerbundes. In 1913, he was honored with the Bavarian Maximilian Order for Science and Art.

From 1906 until his death, he lived in a villa near the Wasaplatz. A street has been named for him in Dresden's  district. in Lübeck a school, originally on the site of his parents' house, was named after him in 1934.

Art collections 
The Behnhaus museum in Lübeck has a collection of paintings by Kuehl, illustrating almost all his developmental phases, and many of the artworks are directly related to the city of Lübeck. The Munich City Museum houses 15 drawings by Kuehl, from the collection of Joseph Maximilian von Maillinger.

Other works of art by Kuehl can be found, among other places, at:
 
Old National Gallery in Berlin
Kunsthalle Hamburg
New Masters Gallery (Dresden State Art Collections)
 Museum of Fine Arts in Leipzig 
Pomeranian State Museum in Greifswald 
Museum Kunstpalast in Düsseldorf 
Lower Saxony State Museum in Hanover
 Dresden City Art Gallery

Selected paintings

Sources 
 Gerhard Gerkens (Ed.), Gotthardt Kuehl 1850–1915. Seemann, Leipzig 1993.
 
 Emil Richter, Gotthardt Kuehl: Kunstausstellung ("Gotthardt Kuehl: Art exhibition"), Dresden 1920.
 Wulf Schadendorf: Museum Behnhaus. Das Haus und seine Räume. Malerei, Skulptur, Kunsthandwerk ("Museum Behnhaus.  The house and its rooms:  Paintings, sculptures, crafts") (Lübeck museum catalogs, vol. 3). Expanded and revised edition.  Museum of Art and Cultural History of the Hanseatic city of Lübeck, 1976, pp. 78–80.

External links 

 
 Article on Gotthardt Kuehl in the Stadtwiki Dresden

19th-century German painters
19th-century German male artists
German male painters
20th-century German painters
20th-century German male artists
German Impressionist painters
1850 births
1915 deaths